Cito may refer to:

 Cito Culver (born 1992), American professional baseball shortstop in the New York Yankees organization
 Cito Gaston (born 1944), former Major League Baseball outfielder and manager
 Claus Cito (1882 – 1965), Luxembourgian sculptor 
 Mercedes-Benz Cito, a low-floor midibus built by EvoBus for Continental Europe between 1999 and 2003
 Latin for urgent / rapid.

CITO may refer to:

 CITO-TV, Canadian television station
 Cache In Trash Out, abbreviated to CITO, are geocaching events and coordinated activities of trash pickup and other maintenance tasks in to improve the environment.